Herbert Gayler (3 December 1881 – 23 June 1917) was a British cyclist. He competed in two events at the 1912 Summer Olympics. He was killed in action during the First World War.

Gayler served as a private in the London Regiment during the First World War. He took part in the Waziristan campaign against the Mahsud tribe, and was killed by sniper fire in an ambush on 23 June 1917. Gayler is commemorated at India Gate.

See also
 List of Olympians killed in World War I

References

External links
 Diary of the campaign, includes the circumstances of Gayler's death
 

1881 births
1917 deaths
Military personnel from Kent
British male cyclists
Olympic cyclists of Great Britain
Cyclists at the 1912 Summer Olympics
People from Christchurch, Dorset
Sportspeople from Dorset
British military personnel killed in World War I
London Regiment soldiers
British Army personnel of World War I
Deaths by firearm in Khyber Pakhtunkhwa